The 2019–20 Panathinaikos season was the club's 61st consecutive season in Super League Greece. They also competed in the Greek Cup.

Transfers

In

Loans In

Out

Loans Out

Team kit

Competitions

Super League Greece

Regular season

League table

Matches

Play-offs

League table

Matches

Greek Cup

Fifth round

Round of 16

Quarter-finals

References

External links 

Panathinaikos F.C. seasons
Panathinaikos